Spiro Ksera (Spyros Xeras) is an Albanian politician and representative of the country's Greek element. He was Minister of Labor, Social Affairs and Equal Opportunities of Albania from 2009 until 2013. He was initially a member of the Greek minority's Unity for Human Rights Party but later became a member of the Democratic Party of Albania.

Ksera, an ethnic Greek, was born in the town of Derviçan, in Dropull region and studied mechanical engineering at the University of Tirana. During the period 2005-2009 he was the prefect of Gjirokastër County, in southern Albania.

See also
Politics of Albania

References

External links 
 Council of ministers. Republic of Albania.

Year of birth missing (living people)
Living people
People from Dropull
Albanian people of Greek descent
Democratic Party of Albania politicians
University of Tirana alumni
21st-century Albanian politicians